Robert Kajuga (born 1 January 1985 in Kaniga, Gicumbi District) is a Rwandan long-distance track and road runner. He represented Rwanda in the 10,000 metres at the 2012 Summer Olympics.

Kajuga qualified to the 2012 Summer Olympics on July 8, 2012 when he ran the 10,000-metre at the African Senior Athletics Championship in Benin in a time of 28:03 (min:sec). After his Olympic debut, where he finished 14th, he began participating in longer-distance road races. On December 24, 2012, he won a 20-km road race in Kigali. Kajuga finished the men's race at the 2013 IAAF World Cross Country Championships in 73rd place of 96 finishers. On April 21, 2013, he ran a half-marathon in Nice, France recording a time of 1:01:37.

He was banned for four years, spanning 25 March 2016 to 2020, after refusing to submit to a doping control after a race in Kigali.

See also
Rwanda at the 2012 Summer Olympics
List of doping cases in athletics

References

External links
 Profile at london2012.com

1985 births
Living people
People from Gicumbi District
Rwandan male long-distance runners
Olympic athletes of Rwanda
Athletes (track and field) at the 2012 Summer Olympics
World Athletics Championships athletes for Rwanda
Doping cases in athletics
Rwandan sportspeople in doping cases